The Shiromani Akali Dal (SAD) (translation: Supreme Akali Party) is a centre-right Sikh-centric state political party in Punjab, India. The party is the second-oldest in India, after Congress, being founded in 1920. Although there are many parties with the description Akali Dal, the party that is recognised as "Shiromani Akali Dal ( Badal ) Aka Badal Dal " by the Election Commission of India is the one led by Sukhbir Singh Badal. The party has a moderate Punjabi agenda. On 26 September 2020, they left the NDA over the farm bills.

There has been speculation over the Shiromani Akali Dal (SAD), Shiromani Akali Dal (Amritsar), Shiromani Akali Dal (Sanyukt), Sanyukt Samaj Morcha, Shiromani Akali Dal Delhi, Punjab Lok Congress, Lok Insaaf Party and Haryana State Akali Dal; which Rajdeep Singh called the 'Shiromani Akali Dal (Lahore)' and would contest in the next elections.

History

British India

Akali Dal was formed on 14 December 1920 as a task force of the Shiromani Gurudwara Prabandhak Committee, the Sikh religious body. The Akali Dal considers itself the principal representative of Sikhs. Sardar Sarmukh Singh Chubbal was the first president of a unified proper Akali Dal, but it became popular under Master Tara Singh. Akali movement influenced 30 new Punjabi newspapers launched between 1920 and 1925.

In the provincial election of 1937, the Akali Dal won 10 seats. The Khalsa Nationalists won 11 seats and joined the coalition government headed by the Unionist leader Sikander Hyat Khan. The Akalis sat in opposition and made occasional forays into reaching an understanding with the Muslim League, which never reached fruition.

In the provincial election of 1946, the Akali Dal won 22 seats and joined the coalition government headed by the Unionist Khizar Hayat Khan Tiwana, along with the Indian National Congress. The Muslim League was unable to capture power, despite having won the largest number of seats, which perhaps suited it fine as it strengthened its Pakistan demand. The Muslim League launched a civil disobedience campaign, bringing down the Tiwana government by March 1947. The rest of the period till Indian independence was filled by Governor's Rule.

As with other Sikh organisations, Master Tara Singh and his Akali Dal strongly opposed the partition of India, which he thought would create an environment of possible persecution.

Independent India
In the 1950s, the party launched the Punjabi Suba movement, demanding a state with majority of Punjabi speaking people, out of undivided East Punjab under the leadership of Sant Fateh Singh. In 1966, the present Punjab was formed. Akali Dal came to power in the new Punjab in March 1967, but early governments didn't live long due to internal conflicts and power struggles within the party. Later, party strengthened and party governments completed full term.

Ideology 
Shiromani Akali Dal's party constitution has important agenda as Protection of Punjab Rights and Punjab's waters and opposition to Sutlej Yamuna link canal is main agenda of party.

1996 Moga Conference 
In 1996, at a historic conference in Moga, Shiromani Akali Dal adopted a moderate Punjabi agenda and shifted party headquarters from Amritsar to Chandigarh.

Party dispute

Sukhdev Singh Dhindsa along with other Akali leaders came together at a Gurdwara in Ludhiana on July 7, 2020 to re-establish SAD (D).
Dhindsa was chosen as president of the revived political party. 
He claimed SAD (D) as the true Shiromani Akali Dal and that the one so called was taken over by the Badal family.

Prior to this in late 2018, expelled senior members of Shiromani Akali Dal Ranjit Singh Brahmpura, Rattan Singh Ajnala, Sewa Singh Sekhwan, their relatives and others had formed SAD (T). The reasoning of the expelling was due to their accusations of the Badal family steering Shiromani Akali Dal in the wrong path.

Because of this dispute, removing Both Dhindsa and Badal from President Rank's will cause fire between supporters and may make the Akali dispute deeper. So any Article including the Akali Party will have to also include either Badal or Dhindsa as Presidents of the party. Daljit Cheema has called this move un   Democratic and fraud and theft, however nobody took that serious... ever since then many people have been joining Dhindsa's faction, he said to the Punjab Democratic Alliance, Navjot Sidhu, Aam Aadmi Party, and all Akali Factions except for Simranjit Mann's to all come together and form a strong third front.

At first everybody thought it was a joke, they said they were all standing with the Badal's when they did the beadbi, but later on, the Lok Insaaf Party admitted that they were having talks. Many Political parties and families have joined with his faction, United Akali Dal merged with the party on July 25, 2020, the Sandhu and Talwandi Families have merged with the party, and so have many more politicians. Now, The Shiromani Akali Dal (Sanyukat) formed by the Rajya Sabha Member Sukhdev Singh Dhindsa after merging his Shiromani Akali Dal (Democratic) and former Lok Sabha Member Ranjit Singh Brahmpura led Shiromani Akali Dal (Taksali). Now, leaders of Shiromani Akali Dal (Sanyukat) are uniting like minded parties on one platform to contest 2022 Punjab Legislative Assembly Elections.

Party presidents
Following is the list of presidents of the party as given on party website.

Current Members in Houses

Punjab Chief Ministers belonging to Akali Dal

In general elections

In state elections

Punjab
1937
1946
1952
1957
1962
1967
1969
1972
1977
1980
1985
1992
1997
2002
2007
2012
2017
2022

Haryana
 2009
 2014

Delhi
 2013
 2015

See also
 Splinter groups of the Akali Dal
 Sikhism
 Tara Singh
 Babu Labh Singh
 Akali (disambiguation)
 Shiromani Akali Dal (Sanyukt)

References

Bibliography
 
 
 
 
 Harjinder Singh Dilgeer. Sikh Twareekh. Sikh University Press, Belgium, 2007. 5 volumes 
 Harjinder Singh Dilgeer. Sikh History.  Sikh University Press, Belgium, 2010–11. 10 volumes
 Harjinder Singh Dilgeer. Shiromani Akali Dal (1920-2000). Sikh University Press, Belgium, 2001.
 Harjinder Singh Dilgeer. NAVAN MAHAN KOSH (DILGEER KOSH, ਦਿਲਗੀਰ ਕੋਸ਼). Sikh University Press, England, 2021.

External links
 

 
Political parties established in 1920
Sikh political parties
Regionalist parties in India
1920 establishments in India
Organisations based in Chandigarh
Right-wing parties
Conservative parties in India
Organizations that oppose LGBT rights